Sir Leonard John Chalstrey  (17 March 1931 – 12 March 2020) was a consultant surgeon and was 668th Lord Mayor of London from 1995 to 1996. 

In 1995, he was knighted and named Master Apothecary of the Worshipful Society of Apothecaries.

He studied at Queens' College, Cambridge (1951–54) before transferring to Barts Medical School to complete his clinical medical training (1954–57).

From 1969 to 1996, Chalstrey was a senior lecturer at St Bartholomew's Medical College, about the historical funding of which he gave an address at Mansion House on 11 June 2001.

He was made a knight of the Most Venerable Order of the Hospital of Saint John of Jerusalem in 1995. He was an Honorary Colonel in the City of London Field Hospital of Royal Army Medical Corps.

Chalstrey was married in 1958 to Aileen Bayes; they had one son and one daughter.

Death
Sir John Chalstrey died at his home  on 12 March 2020 at the age of 88.

Arms

Publication

References 

20th-century lord mayors of London
20th-century English politicians
1931 births
2020 deaths
Fellows of the Royal College of Surgeons
Knights of the Order of St John
Knights Bachelor
British surgeons
Alumni of Queens' College, Cambridge
English justices of the peace